Jose Priscillo G. Diniz (born 12 December 1948) is a Brazilian professional golfer.

Diniz was born in São Paulo. He comes from a family which boasts several other professional golfers, including his grandfather, but he did not turn professional himself until the age of 28, having previously been a practicing lawyer. As an amateur he was twice Brazilian Amateur champion and he also won the 1975 South American Amateur Championship.

In his regular (that is under fifty) career, Diniz won several titles on the South American circuit. He played on the European Tour in 1977 and 1978, but with little success. In 2000 he was the Rookie of the Year on the European Seniors Tour and finished sixth on that tour's Order of Merit. He has won two European Seniors Tour events, the 2000 The Daily Telegraph European Seniors Match Play Championship and the 2001 Royal Westmoreland Barbados Open.

Amateur wins (4)
1974 Brazilian Amateur Championship
1975 South American Amateur Championship, Brazilian Amateur Championship
1976 Simon Bolivar Cup (Venezuela)

Professional wins (12)

South American wins (10)
1975 Brazil Open (as an amateur)
1977 Uruguay Open
1978 Brazil PGA Championship, Medellin Open (Colombia)
1979 Brazil PGA Championship
1985 Peru Open
1986 Peru Open
1991 Brazilian Masters
1992 Brazilian Masters, Johnnie Walker Classic (Brazil)

European Senior Tour wins (2)

Team appearances
Amateur
Eisenhower Trophy (representing Brazil): 1974, 1976

Professional
World Cup (representing Brazil): 1983, 1984, 1985, 1987, 1988
Dunhill Cup (representing Brazil): 1988

External links

Brazilian male golfers
European Tour golfers
European Senior Tour golfers
Sportspeople from São Paulo
1948 births
Living people